Sackcloth ( śaq) is a coarsely woven fabric, usually made of goat's hair. The term in English often connotes the biblical usage, where the Hastings' Dictionary of the Bible remarks that haircloth would be more appropriate rendering of the Hebrew meaning.

In some Christian traditions (notably Catholicism), the wearing of hairshirts continues as a self-imposed means of mortifying the flesh that is often practiced during the Christian penitential season of Lent, especially on Ash Wednesday, Good Friday, and other Fridays of the Lenten season.

As fabric
Hessian sackcloth or burlap is not the intended biblical meaning, according to a number of scholarly sources: but it is a common misconception based on phonetic association. "Sackcloth, usually made of black goat hair, was used by the Israelites and their neighbors in times of mourning or social protest." Burlap as another term used in English translation is also generally understood as goat haircloth. Stiff camel hair was also used.

As garment

Sackcloth came to mean a garment, too, made from such cloth, which was worn as a token of mourning by the Israelites. It was also a sign of submission (1 Kings 20:31–32), or of grief and self-humiliation (2 Kings 19:1), and was occasionally worn by the Prophets. It is often associated with ashes. 

The 1906 Jewish Encyclopedia says the Old Testament gives no exact description of the garment. According to Adolf Kamphausen, the sacḳ was like a corn-bag with an opening for the head, and another for each arm, an opening being made in the garment from top to bottom. Karl Grüneisen  thought it resembled a hairy mantle used by the Bedouins. Friedrich Schwally concluded otherwise that it originally was simply the loin-cloth. Schwally based his opinion on the fact that the word "ḥagar" חָגַר (to gird) is used in describing the putting on of the garment (see Joshua 1:8; Isaiah 3:24, 15:8, 22:12; Jeremiah 6:26, 49:3). One fastens it around the hips ("sim be-motnayim", Genesis 37:34; "he'elah 'al motnayim", Amos 8:10), while, in describing taking it offing of the sacḳ, the words "pitteaḥ me-'al motnayim" are used (Isaiah 20:2). According to 1 Kings 21:27 and 2 Kings 6:30, it was worn next to the skin.

In later times it came to be worn for religious purposes only, on extraordinary occasions, or at mourning ceremonies. Isaiah wore nothing else, and was commanded by God to don it (Isaiah 20:2). The Jewish Encyclopedia suggests that "old traditions about to die out easily assume a holy character". Thus Schwally points to the circumstance that the Muslim pilgrim, as soon as he puts his foot on Ḥaram, the holy soil, takes off all the clothes he is wearing, and dons the iḥram.

See also

Repentance (Christianity)
Cilice
Penance
Mortification of the flesh
Flagellant
Hessian fabric
Felt

References

Much of this article is taken from the article Sackcloth by Joseph Jacobs and Wilhelm Nowack in the 1906 Jewish Encyclopedia, now in the public domain in the United States as a work published before 1923. 
 Schwally, Das Leben nach dem Tode (The Life After Death), pp. 11 et seq., Giessen, 1892

Textiles